Kottum Kuravayum is a 1987 Indian Malayalam film, directed by Alleppey Ashraf and produced by Eeraali. The film stars Sukumari, Mammootty, Jagathy Sreekumar and Innocent in the lead roles. The film has musical score by Raghu Kumar.

Cast 

Sukumari
Mammootty
Jagathy Sreekumar
Innocent
Mukesh
Urvashi
Ratheesh
Sreenivasan
Bobby Kottarakkara
Kaduvakulam Antony
Mala Aravindan
Shari
T. G. Ravi

Soundtrack 
The music was composed by Raghu Kumar and the lyrics were written by Panthalam Sudhakaran.

References

External links 
 

1987 films
1980s Malayalam-language films
Films scored by Raghu Kumar
Films directed by Alleppey Ashraf